Holiday Beach is an unincorporated community and census-designated place in Aransas County, Texas, United States. As of the 2010 census it had a population of 514. This was a new CDP for the 2010 census.

Geography
Holiday Beach is located at  (28.167125, -97.008001).

History
Development of the area began in the mid-1960s, when a group of Dallas investors organized the Copano Land Company. The first lots were sold around 1964. The subdivision continued to develop with waterfront homes and boat canals throughout the remainder of the twentieth century. Holiday Beach was home to an estimated 1,000 residents in 2000.

In August 2017, Hurricane Harvey destroyed the area after making landfall in Holiday Beach.

Subdivisions
Holiday Beach is divided into twelve subdivision sections. They are Bayview, Belaire, Hillcrest, Mesquite Tree, Newcomb Bend, Northview, Oak Shores, Palmetto Point, St. Charles, Sherwood Downs, Southview, and Woodland Hills.

Education
Public education in the community of Holiday Lakes is provided by the Aransas County Independent School District.

References

External links
Community of Holiday Beach
RockportFulton.com Local Area Guide

Census-designated places in Texas
Census-designated places in Aransas County, Texas
Unincorporated communities in Texas